Katarchic astrology is the implementation of a type of horoscopic astrology in order to determine when would be most beneficial and rewarding moment in time to take a venture or undertaking, and is also known as electional astrology. Electional astrology is typically used to interpret the level of success of a moment that has already taken place. In modern time, electional astrology is more commonly known as inceptional astrology. Hellenistic and Byzantine traditions used the term katarchē in order to refer to electional astrology and inceptional astrology, which is also part of Katarchic astrology. Katarkhé was used to discover and confirm events of the past. These events include following the history and path taken by a certain illness, or tracking missing items and people such as criminals or those escaping slavery. 

Originally when Katarchic astrology was practiced, it typically was used to determine the best timing to conduct events such as weddings, and also to answer specific questions. It guided individuals on whether or not to continue or proceed in a course of action and worked to help guarantee the ideal result. In more recent times, Katarchic astrology is used to predict the future of individuals and influence the outcome of their future.

Comparison to genethlialogy 
In comparison to genethlialogy, Katarchic astrology is seen to represent less of the idea that the events of life are predetermined. Where genethlialogy may see events as inevitable, Katarchic astrology thought it was possible to avoid the future the planets predicted for individuals. Some believe that those studying Katarchic Astrology were critical to the Roman Empire and had impact on the social and political aspects of this empire. Katarchic astrology along ide genethlialogy evolved into the better known interrogational astrology. This was also known as horary astrology at the time, and was the practice of finding an answer to a specific question in time through the use of a horoscopic chart.

Notable people in Katarchic astrology 
Dorotheus of Sidon is one of the more significant of all authors on the topic of Katarchic astrology. His work dates back to the first century CE. His writing was translated into Arabic ca. 800 CE. Dorotheus wrote a series of five books, each one relating to topics of Hellenistic astrology. Book 5 of Dorotheus "covers all forms of Katarchic astrology, including elections and interrogations". This book focuses on different experiences humans may have had, including but not limited to finding objects or people that may have been lost, or building on life's journey. Dorotheus's writing became known among other writers in the Byzantine period. 

Augustine is another notable historian with opinions on Katarchic astrology. He argued against topics of astrology and divination during his life time. He was first exposed to astrology as a Manichean before he converted to Christianity. His main argument against Katarchic astrology was the way it opposed the points made by natal astrology. He claims that if a persons future is laid out for them by their natal charts, how can choosing the timing of an event have an impact. He further explains that those astrologers who made correct predictions were truly "inspiration of evil diamons rather than the study of astrological techniques".

See also
Event chart
Katarche

References

Astrology by type
Hellenistic astrology